This is a list of equipment of the Angolan Army in service.

Many of Angola's weapons are of Portuguese colonial and Warsaw Pact origin.

Infantry weapons

Anti-tank

Grenade launchers

Rifles

Pistols

Submachine guns

Machine guns

Mortars

Vehicles

Tanks

Tank destroyers

Infantry fighting vehicles

Armored scout vehicles

Armored personnel carriers

Mine-resistant ambush protected vehicles

Engineering vehicles

Other vehicles

Artillery

Anti-aircraft weaponry

References

Military of Angola
Military history of Angola
Angolan Army